Workplace listening is a type of active listening that is generally employed in a professional environment. Listening skills are imperative for career success, organizational effectiveness, and worker satisfaction. Workplace listening includes understanding the listening process (i.e. perception, interpretation, evaluation, and action) and its barriers that hamper the flow of that process. Like other skills, there are specific techniques for improving workplace listening effectiveness. Moreover, it is imperative to become aware of the role of nonverbal communication in communicating in the workplace, as understanding messages wholly entails more than simple verbal messages.

See also

References
 Anderson. P.A. (2008). Nonverbal Communication Forms and Functions (2nd ed.). Long Grove: Waveland Press Inc.
 Guffey, M.E., Rhodes, K., & Rogin, P. (2006). Business Communication: process and product (3rd ed.). Mason: Thomson South-Western.

Counseling
Behavioural sciences
Workplace